The Belgian Second Division winners are the winners of the second–highest league in Belgian football. The Second Division was established in 1905, as the Promotion. In 1923, the Promotion was played in two leagues of 14 clubs each. In 1926, when the Belgian First Division was renamed Premier Division, the Promotion became the First Division and was played in one league of 14 clubs. In 1931, the second level was split again into two leagues of 14 clubs. During and after World War II, the number of clubs in the First Division was not stable, and in 1947 it was stabilized to 16 clubs. In 1952, the First Division was renamed Second Division and was played in one league of 16 clubs. In 1973–74, a final round was introduced to decide the second club promoting to the First Division. In 1994, the number of clubs was increased to 18.

Promotion (1905–1923)

Promotion A and Promotion B (1923–1926)

First Division (1926–1931)

First Division A and First Division B (1931–1952)

Second Division (1952–1973)

Second division (1973–2016)
From 1973 to 2016, the second division winner and the play–off winner promote to the first division.

Number of titles overall
 6 wins: KV Mechelen
 5 wins: R Tilleur FC, R Berchem Sport, R White Daring Molenbeek
 4 wins: RFC Brugeois, Uccle Sport, K Lyra, KAA Gent, KRC Mechelen, KSK Beveren, Sint-Truiden
 3 wins: R Beeringen FC, KSV Cercle Brugge, FC Liégeois, RC de Bruxelles, RRC Gand, R Daring Club de Bruxelles, KSV Waterschei Thor
 2 wins: Standard FC Liégeois, SC Anderlechtois, R Union Saint-Gilloise, CS Verviétois, KSC Eendracht Aalst, KFC Diest, OC Charleroi, K Boom FC, K Sint-Niklase SK, RFC Sérésien, KSV Waregem, KFC Lommelse SK, K Lierse SK, KV Oostende
 1 win: FC Turnhout, RC Montegnée, Beerschot AC, Union Saint-Gilloise II, Belgica FC Edegem, RC Tirlemont, CS La Forestoise, R Charleroi SC, K Stade Leuven, RUS Tournaisienne, AS Oostende KM, KFC Winterslag, KSK Tongeren, KFC Germinal Ekeren, KSC Lokeren, R Antwerp FC, FC Molenbeek Brussels Strombeek, SV Zulte-Waregem, R Albert Elizabeth Club Mons, FC Verbroedering Dender EH, KV Kortrijk, Oud-Heverlee Leuven, Westerlo

References

winners